The Weißer Stein (German for White Stone; in English also written as Weisser Stein) is located in the forest of Mürringen, a hamlet of the Büllingen municipality in East Belgium. It is the highest point of this village and the second-highest point of Belgium. It also lies on the border with the German state of North Rhine-Westphalia.

German measurements (until 1920 the area belonged to Germany) indicated an altitude of 689 m (NN, German standard) at the nearby located measuring point, and a small higher area surrounded by the 690-meter altitude line. In 2007 the University of Liège executed measurements and found a height of 692 m (TAW, Belgian standard). The altitude meter of Google Earth caused some doubt about Signal de Botrange (694 m TAW) as Belgium's highest point because its vertical reference EGM96 deviates a couple of meters from the German Normalnull and the Belgian TAW, thereby suggesting an altitude of 701 m for the Weißer Stein. An accurate control by the Belgian National Geographic Institute in 2010 showed the Weißer Stein to be at maximum 693.3 m TAW (=691 m NN), with which it differs by less than 1 m from Signal de Botrange.

References

Mountains under 1000 metres
Mountains and hills of the Eifel
Mountains and hills of the Ardennes (Belgium)
Mountains and hills of Liège Province
German-speaking Community of Belgium
Büllingen
Bogs of North Rhine-Westphalia